Anke Huber was the defending champion but lost in the semifinals to Miriam Oremans.

Ruxandra Dragomir won in the final 5–7, 6–2, 6–4 against Oremans.

Seeds
A champion seed is indicated in bold text while text in italics indicates the round in which that seed was eliminated. The top two seeds received a bye to the second round.

  Anke Huber (semifinals)
  Mary Pierce (quarterfinals)
  Ruxandra Dragomir (champion)
  Karina Habšudová (quarterfinals)
  Sabine Appelmans (quarterfinals)
  Dominique Van Roost (quarterfinals)
  Patty Schnyder (first round)
  Åsa Carlsson (semifinals)

Draw

Final

Top half

Bottom half

External links
 1997 Heineken Trophy Draw
 Main draw (WTA)

Women's Singles
Singles